Tone Đurišič (born 13 July 1961) is a Slovenian cross-country skier. He competed for Yugoslavia in the men's 15 kilometre event at the 1980 Winter Olympics.

References

External links
 

1961 births
Living people
Slovenian male cross-country skiers
Olympic cross-country skiers of Yugoslavia
Cross-country skiers at the 1980 Winter Olympics
People from the Municipality of Kranjska Gora